Sonya Williams is a New Zealand entrepreneur and businesswoman. 

Williams is a co-founder of the micro-investing platform Sharesies and the company's chief executive for product and marketing. Williams was the joint winner of the 2020 New Zealand Women of Influence Award in the Business Enterprise section.

Williams is a graduate of Victoria University of Wellington.

References

Living people
New Zealand Women of Influence Award recipients
Victoria University of Wellington alumni
Year of birth missing (living people)
New Zealand women in business
New Zealand businesspeople